The View from Here may refer to:

The View from Here (Bob Bennett album), a 2002 album by Bob Bennett
The View from Here (TV series), a Canadian television series
The View from Here: Conversations with Gay and Lesbian Filmmakers, a 2007 book by Matthew Hays
The View from Here, an album by Shari Ulrich
The View from Here (column), a column in Life magazine by Loudon Wainwright